Uganda competed at the 2004 Summer Olympics in Athens, Greece, from 13 to 29 August 2004. This was the nation's twelfth appearance at the Olympics, except the 1976 Summer Olympics in Montreal, because of the African boycott. The Ugandan Olympic Committee sent a total of eleven athletes to the Games, nine men and two women, to compete in four different sports. Half of these athletes had been participating in boxing, including Joseph Lubega, who later became the nation's flag bearer in the opening ceremony. There was only a single competitor in swimming and weightlifting.

Uganda left Athens without a single Olympic medal, since the 1972 Summer Olympics in Munich, where the late John Akii-Bua won the gold in the men's 400 m hurdles. The nation's best result came with a fourth-place finish from Boniface Kiprop in the men's 10,000 metres.

Athletics

Ugandan athletes have so far achieved qualifying standards in the following athletics events (up to a maximum of 3 athletes in each event at the 'A' Standard, and 1 at the 'B' Standard).

Men

Women

Key
Note–Ranks given for track events are within the athlete's heat only
Q = Qualified for the next round
q = Qualified for the next round as a fastest loser or, in field events, by position without achieving the qualifying target
NR = National record
N/A = Round not applicable for the event
Bye = Athlete not required to compete in round

Boxing

Uganda sent five boxers to Athens.

Swimming

Men

Weightlifting 

Uganda has qualified a single female weightlifter.

See also
 Uganda at the 2004 Summer Paralympics

References

External links
Official Report of the XXVIII Olympiad

Nations at the 2004 Summer Olympics
2004
Summer Olympics